Mecitözü is a town in Çorum Province in the Black Sea region of Turkey, 37 km from the city of Çorum. It is the seat of Mecitözü District. Its population is 4,036 (2022). The mayor is Veli Aylar (CHP). 

Mecitözü stands in a small plain surrounded by mountains. Average annual rainfall is 422.7 mm. People get along on farming, especially on growing sugar beet and grains. There is also a flour mill and a brickworks. The town of Mecitözü provides the surrounding district with schools, sports facilities, a hospital and other basic infrastructure. There are three more health centres in the countryside. 

Excavations in the villages of Kuşsaray and Elvançelebi indicate habitation since 5000 BC.

References

Populated places in Çorum Province
Mecitözü District
Towns in Turkey